Trichoncoides is a genus of sheet weavers that was first described by J. Denis in 1950.

Species
 it contains three species.
Trichoncoides pilosus Denis, 1950 (type) − France
Trichoncoides piscator (Simon, 1884) − Europe, North Africa, Turkey, Caucasus, Russia (Europe to South Siberia), Kazakhstan, Iran, Central Asia
Trichoncoides striganovae Tanasevitch & Piterkina, 2012 − Russia (Europe), Kazakhstan

See also
 List of Linyphiidae species (Q–Z)

References

Araneomorphae genera
Linyphiidae
Palearctic spiders
Spiders of Asia